Russian Expo Arms (or Russia Arms Expo, abbreviated as RAE) is the international exhibition of arms, military equipment and ammunition that is regularly held in Nizhny Tagil, Russia since 1999.

According to organizers, the event is dedicated to "active innovative policy of the enterprises of the defense and industrial complex, adoption of advanced technology are guarantees of success of modernization and creation of samples of armament and military equipment, and perspective view of Armed Forces of Russia."

The venue of the exhibit is the Staratel test range at Nizhny Tagil Institute of Metal Testing (NTIIM). The main exhibitor is the Nizhny Tagil-based Uralvagonzavod machinery plant, one of the largest scientific and industrial complexes in Russia and the largest main battle tank manufacturer in the world. In recent years, the core products presented at the event are modifications of T-90, most advanced Russian series tank.

The 8th exhibit was held on September 8–11, 2011. Russian prime minister Vladimir Putin, Sverdlovsk Oblast governor Alexander Misharin and many other top officials have to attended the event. About 300 Russian and international arms manufacturers have participated with around 2,500 products.

Russia Arms Expo 2013 (RAE 2013) 
September 25 – 28, 2013 RAE 2013 will bring together all major stakeholders in the field of global military cooperation for a series of insightful debates and vivid introductions of cutting-edge military equipment.

The Exhibition seeks to promote Russian military equipment, arms and ammunition to both domestic and foreign markets, expand the range of foreign partners, demonstrate the latest achievements of the Russian and foreign manufacturers, develop business contacts between producers and buyers of the military equipment, weapons and ammunition from around the world.

Russia Arms EXPO 2013 features 
 The largest international exhibition of military products held under the patronage of the Government of the Russian Federation
 Intensive conference programme
 Unique opportunities for demonstration of combat and operational capabilities of the military equipment
 Over 400 exhibitors from 50 countries

Areas covered by the Exhibition 
Military equipment and its components
 Weapons and their components
 Unmanned aerial vehicle (UAVs) of aeroplane, helicopter and balloon types
 Ammunition and its components. Firing of self-propelled, field, tank, anti-tank, anti-aircraft, naval and airborne artillery
 Logistical equipment, resources and assets
 Simulators and technical training resources
 Equipment for railway troops

Russian Defense Expo 
Russian Defense Expo is the parallel exhibit held at the same site alternately, in the years when RAE isn't held. It is dedicated to non-armed support vehicles for military, emergency and other forces.

References

Culture of Sverdlovsk Oblast
Arms fairs
Trade fairs in Russia